Brian Carlson (born March 6, 1962) is a former head football coach for Kean University in Union, New Jersey. In eight seasons as head football coach (1992–1999), he compiled a record of 24–48–4, including a New Jersey Athletic Conference Co-Championship in 1994.

Head coaching record

References

1962 births
Living people
Kean Cougars football coaches